Frank Rinaldo Baker (November 11, 1861 – April 9, 1952) was an American politician in the state of Washington. He served in the Washington House of Representatives.

References

Members of the Washington House of Representatives
1861 births
1952 deaths
Washington (state) Populists
People from Van Buren County, Iowa